Papyrus Oxyrhynchus 81 (P. Oxy. 81) is a declaration on oath by a tax collector, written in Greek. The manuscript was written on papyrus in the form of a sheet. It was discovered by Grenfell and Hunt in 1897 in Oxyrhynchus. The document was written between 244-245. Currently it is housed in the British Museum (757) in London. The text was published by Grenfell and Hunt in 1898.

The letter is addressed to a strategus of Oxyrhynchus. It was written by a tax collector of Oxyrhynchus, whose name was Aurelius Apion. The measurements of the fragment are 82 by 72 mm.

See also 
 Oxyrhynchus Papyri
 Papyrus Oxyrhynchus 80
 Papyrus Oxyrhynchus 82

References 

081
3rd-century manuscripts